Ahmad Latifovich Alaskarov (5 October 1935 – 19 May 2015) was an Azerbaijani footballer and manager.

Biography
After graduating from Azerbaijan State Physical Culture and Sports Academy, Alaskarov played for Neftchi Baku as a defender from 1955 to 1965 and managed the side in the 1960s, 1980s, and 2000s.

Alaskarov has also managed the Azerbaijani national football team. He was classified as a Master of Sport of the USSR in 1963. Alaskarov died in 2015 in Odessa, Ukraine.

References

External links 
 

1935 births
2015 deaths
Azerbaijani footballers
Soviet footballers
Neftçi PFK managers
Footballers from Baku
Soviet football managers
Azerbaijani football managers
Azerbaijan national football team managers
Azerbaijani expatriate football managers
CSKA Pamir Dushanbe managers
FC Chornomorets Odesa managers
FC Kryvbas Kryvyi Rih managers
Expatriate football managers in Moldova
FC Zimbru Chișinău managers
Expatriate football managers in Russia
FC Anzhi Makhachkala managers
FC Sheriff Tiraspol managers
Azerbaijani expatriate sportspeople in Russia
Azerbaijani expatriate sportspeople in Moldova
Soviet Azerbaijani people
Association football defenders
Neftçi PFK players
Soviet Top League players
Honoured Masters of Sport of the USSR